Banwarilal Bhalotia College, known by the abbreviation B. B. College, established in 1944, is a college in Asansol, Paschim Bardhaman district, West Bengal, India. It offers undergraduate courses in arts, commerce and sciences. It is affiliated with Kazi Nazrul University, Asansol.

History
The Potentiality of Asansol as an industrial metropolitan Centre had been realized from the very beginning of the 20th century. The need of the day was to give the region a boost in higher education to facilities its growth and development. It was Prof. Satyakali Mukherjee who had submitted a proposal for the first time for opening a college in Asansol in 1944 to the existing Chairman of Asansol Municipality, Mr. Jogendranath Roy and the then SDO, Mr. Woodford, I.C.S. This is noble endeavor was supported by eminent stalwarts of Society as well as the general people of different strata who donated generously for the establishment of a higher academic institution.

A leading businessman and entrepreneur, Mr. G.S.Atwal initiated the move by constructing a field-building for the purpose in 1944 which was named Asansol College, affiliated to the University of Calcutta. I.A. Classes began with a students strength of only 132. However, after this humble beginning, different corporate bodies and education stalwarts of Asansol, eminent representative of the society holding high positions, along with positive effort of the staff of Asansol Municipal Corporation and the Eastern Railway, collectively contributed towards to establishment of this college, A renowned businessman of the locality, who was also a freedom fighter, a social reformer as well as a visionary, Sri Banwarilal Bhalotia, magnanimously donated a plot of land of 20 Bighas towards a permanent building for the asansol College, Not of less importance is the impetus and support of Late Sri Shivdas Ghatak and Dr. B.C. Roy, the then Chief Minister of Bengal. With of unanimous encouragement and support all sections of the society, the newly constructed college building (the present old building of the college) was inaugurated by the then Vice-Chancellor of Burdwan University, Sri S.K. Guha, and the college (B.B.College in short, enrolling itself under Burdwan University) in acknowledgment of the generous and unconditional support of the charismatic personality.

Courses

The college offers undergraduate and postgraduate courses in science, arts, commerce, business, computer science and computer application; across various streams. These are: B.Sc, B.Sc (Hons), B.A, B.A (Hons), B.Com, B.Com (Hons), B.BA and B.CA at the UG level. And M.Sc, M.A and M.Com at the PG level.

Departments

Science
Microbiology
Chemistry
Physics (both undergraduate and post graduate courses)
Mathematics
Electronics
Botany
Zoology

Arts
Education
Bengali
English
Sanskrit
Hindi (both undergraduate and post graduate courses)
Urdu
History
Geography
Political Science
Philosophy
Economics

Commerce
Accountancy
Finance

Hindi Medium Shift
Following honours courses are now open for Hindi medium students
 Mathematics
 Botany
 Geography
 Political science
 History

Professional Courses
This college also offers professional studies courses those are
 B.B.A.
 B.C.A.

Accreditation
The college was accredited "A" grade by NAAC. The college is also recognized by the University Grants Commission (UGC).

See also

References

External links
Banwarilal Bhalotia College
Kazi Nazrul University
University Grants Commission
National Assessment and Accreditation Council

Colleges affiliated to Kazi Nazrul University
Educational institutions established in 1944
Universities and colleges in Paschim Bardhaman district
Education in Asansol
1944 establishments in India